The extinct Ngatutura volcanic field that was active between 1.54 and 1.83 million years ago  is one of four volcanic fields in an intraplate back arc relationship with the still active Hauraki Rift and the presently dormant Auckland volcanic field . The other volcanic fields, which are part of the Auckland Volcanic Province, are the oldest, Okete to the south near Raglan in late Pliocene times (2.7-1.8 Ma). and to the north the younger South Auckland volcanic field.

Geology
This field is smaller than the other three and has far fewer basaltic volcanic centres. However at least 16 volcanic centres, mostly scoria cones associated with lava flows of limited hawaiite to nepheline hawaiite composition are known. Some of the basalt deposits in this region of the coast are now known to be related to the West Ngatutura volcanic field with a stratigraphic age of c. 3.5 Ma around 60 km offshore.
The earlier work on the field had suggested fewer centres being: 
Initial vent
This was under the present sea but basaltic lava flowed to the east so is identifiable in present coastal stratigraphy.
Ohuka Centre
Quarry Centre
Two vents with limited basaltic extrusions, perhaps erupted along the Ohuka fault plane.
Ngatutura Complex
Associated with at least five major phases of activity with evidence in nearby bays along the coast. Included some violent magmatophreatic eruptions

See also
Geology of the Auckland Region
Geology of the Waikato Region
List of volcanoes in New Zealand
Volcanism in New Zealand
Stratigraphy of New Zealand
Auckland volcanic field
South Auckland volcanic field

References

Monogenetic volcanic fields
Geography of Waikato
Landforms of Waikato
Volcanism of New Zealand
Geology of New Zealand
Volcanoes of Waikato
Auckland Volcanic Province